The Biltmore Apartments is a building complex located in northwest Portland, Oregon listed on the National Register of Historic Places.

See also
 National Register of Historic Places listings in Northwest Portland, Oregon

References

1924 establishments in Oregon
Residential buildings completed in 1924
Apartment buildings on the National Register of Historic Places in Portland, Oregon
Northwest Portland, Oregon
Portland Historic Landmarks